was a Japanese Orientalist, Indologist, philosopher and academic of Vedic, Hindu and Buddhist scriptures.

Biography
Nakamura was born in Matsue, Shimane Prefecture, Japan. In 1943 he graduated from the Department of Literature at Tokyo Imperial University on a study on "The History of Early Vedanta Philosophy" under the supervision of Prof. Hakuju Ui. In 1943 he succeeded Prof. Ui and was appointed Associate Professor of Tokyo Imperial University.

He was a professor there from 1954 to 1973. After retiring from Tokyo University, he established Toho Gakuin (The Eastern Institute, Inc.) and lectured on philosophy to the general public.

Academic studies
Nakamura was an expert on Sanskrit and Pali, and among his many writings are commentaries on Buddhist scriptures. He is most known in Japan as the first to translate the entire Pali Tripitaka into Japanese. This work is still considered the definitive translation to date against which later translations are measured. The footnotes in his Pali translation often refer to other previous translations in German, English, French as well as the ancient Chinese translations of Sanskrit scriptures.

Because of his meticulous approach to translation he had a dominating and lasting influence in the study of Indic philosophy in Japan at a time when it was establishing itself throughout the major Japanese universities. He also indirectly influenced the secular scholastic study of Buddhism throughout Eastern and Southern Asia, especially Taiwan and Korea. Japan, Korea, Taiwan and recently China is the only area in which all major scriptural languages of Buddhism (Chinese, Tibetan, Sanskrit and Pali) are taught and studied by academics of Indic philosophy.

Nakamura was influenced by the Indian philosophy of Buddhism, Chinese, Japanese and Western thought. He made remarks on the problem of bioethics.

Nakamura published more than 170 monographs, both in Japanese and in Western languages, and over a thousand articles.

Awards
 An Imperial Award of the Japan Academy for "The History of Early Vedanta Philosophy", a slightly revised version of his doctoral thesis
 The Order of Culture in 1977 (Japan)
 A nomination to the Japan Academy in 1982.
 Honorary degree of Vidya-Vacaspati by President of India Dr Sarvepalli Radhakrishnan.

Publications

Sources

 
 
 Корнеев М. Я. Хадзимэ Накамура как мыслитель-компаративист: первые подходы к анализу его творчества // Компаративистика- II: Альманах сравнительных социогуманитарных исследований. СПб., 2002. С. 84–87.

External links
 Nakamura, The ideal ultimate goal in life in the Early Buddhism
 Nakamura, Hinduism Influence on Japanese Culture. Japan Times, Tokyo, January 26, 1992

References

Philosophers of religion
Japanese scholars of Buddhism
20th-century Japanese philosophers
Japanese lexicographers
University of Tokyo alumni
People from Shimane Prefecture
1912 births
1999 deaths
Recipients of the Order of Culture
Japanese indologists
20th-century Japanese translators
Advaita Vedanta
Recipients of the Medal with Purple Ribbon
20th-century lexicographers